Ridly Greig (born August 8, 2002) is a Canadian professional ice hockey centre for the  Ottawa Senators of the National Hockey League (NHL).  He was drafted by the Senators in the first round of the 2020 NHL Entry Draft with the 28th overall pick.

Playing career
Greig played major junior hockey with the Brandon Wheat Kings of the Western Hockey League (WHL). After his selection to the Ottawa Senators in the 2020 NHL Entry Draft, Greig was signed by the Ottawa Senators to a three-year, entry-level contract on December 30, 2020. Greig played two more seasons in the WHL, before joining the Senators' American Hockey League (AHL) affiliate, the Belleville Senators, at the end of the 2021–22 season and played in Belleville's Calder Cup playoff loss to the Rochester Americans. He joined Belleville full-time at the beginning of the 2022–23 season. Greig was recalled by Ottawa on January 23, 2023. Greig made his NHL debut on January 25, 2023, in Ottawa against the New York Islanders playing on a line with Alex DeBrincat and Claude Giroux. He registered an assist in the game. On February 19, 2023, Greig scored his first NHL goal against the St. Louis Blues.

International play

Greig was selected for Team Canada's roster for the 2022 World Junior Ice Hockey Championships. He distinguished himself in the early going, being named the team's best player in two of four group stage games. He then suffered an injury in the first period of the quarter-final game against Team Switzerland, as a result of which he missed the remainder of the tournament, considered a significant loss for the team. However, Greig shared in Team Canada's eventual gold medal win.

Personal life
His father Mark Greig played nine seasons in the National Hockey League (NHL) for the Hartford Whalers, Toronto Maple Leafs, Calgary Flames and Philadelphia Flyers. Of note, he has two sisters named Kyra and Dara, who joined the University of Wisconsin Badgers women's ice hockey program in the autumn of 2019.

Career statistics

Regular season and playoffs

International

References

External links

2002 births
Living people
Belleville Senators players
Brandon Wheat Kings players
Canadian ice hockey centres
Ice hockey people from Alberta
Ottawa Senators draft picks
Ottawa Senators players
Sportspeople from Lethbridge